The 55th Naval Infantry Division (Military Unit Number 30926) was an infantry division of the Soviet Navy and Russian Navy's Naval Infantry, established in 1968 and disestablished in 2009. 

It draws its Second World War history from the 55th Rifle Division which became a naval garrison division after the end of the Continuation War with Finland.

In the middle of 1967, the leadership of the USSR Armed Forces decided to create a naval infantry formation as part of the Pacific Fleet.

In the period from August 1968 to December 1, 1968, on the basis of the 390th Separate Naval Infantry Regiment of the Pacific Fleet, the 55th Naval Infantry Division was formed.

Later, by order of the Minister of Defence of the USSR No. 007 dated February 22, 1971, December 1 was declared the "Day of the unit" of the 55th DNI.

Following the practice adopted in the Soviet Armed Forces on preserving the honorary traditions and continuity of honorary titles received by formations during the Great Patriotic War, the newly formed division was transferred the battle banners and honorary regalia of the 1st machine-gun and artillery Mozyr Red Banner Division Baltic Fleet, which was disbanded in January 1956.

The transfer of regalia and honorary names of the regiments of the 1st Naval Machine Gun Artillery Division to the regiments of the 55th DMP did not take place. The regiments received battle flags in December 1969.

The full name of the 55th DNI became the 55th Mozyr Red Banner Marine Division.

References

 Michael Holm, 55th Naval Infantry Division, c2015
 

Russian Naval Infantry
Divisions of Russia
Divisions of the Soviet Union
Marine corps units and formations
Military units and formations established in 1968